Ali Bey usually refers to Ali Bey al-Kabir (1728–1773), a Mamluk leader of Egypt.

Ali Bey or Ali Beg may also refer to:

People 
 Mihaloğlu Ali Bey (1425–1507), Ottoman military commander and sanjakbey of Smederevo
 Ali Bey Evrenosoglu, or simply Ali Bey, fifteenth-century Ottoman military commander
 Ali Bey, Prince of Dulkadir (fl. 1515), governor of Dulkadir
 Wojciech Bobowski (1610–1675), also known as Ali Bey, Polish musician and translator of the Bible into Turkish
 Ali Bey of Tunis (d. 1682), a Muradid
 Ali Bey al-Abbasi (1766–1818), pseudonym of Domènec Badia i Leblich, Spanish explorer and spy
 Ali Bey (officer), Mehmet Ali Bey (1874–?), Ottoman and Turkish officer
 Ali Çetinkaya, "Kel" Ali Bey (1878–1949), Ottoman-Turkish officer and politician
 Ali Kemal Bey (1867–1922), Ottoman journalist, newspaper editor and poet
 Ali Kılıç, Kılıç Ali Bey (1890–1971), Ottoman-Turkish officer and politician
 Nawab Muhammad Ali Beg (born 1852), Indian Army officer

Other uses
 Ali Bey, an 1818 book by Samuel Lorenzo Knapp

See also
 Geli Ali Beg Waterfall, Iraqi Kurdistan
 Awakening, or Ali Bey’s Experiences, an 1874 novel by Namık Kemal